The 2010 Philippine Basketball Association (PBA) Fiesta Conference was the last conference of the 2009-10 PBA season. It started on March 21 and finished on August 18, 2010. The tournament is an Import-laden format, which requires an import or a pure-foreign player for each team and with a height limit of 6-foot-6 (same with the previous Fiesta Conferences except 2008 which had imports of unlimited heights, and of 2007 where the two worst teams in the Philippine Cup had an extra import of 6-foot-1 height limit).

Format
The following format will be observed for the duration of the conference:
 Double-round robin eliminations; 18 games per team; Teams are then seeded by basis on win–loss records. Ties are broken among points differences of the tied teams.
 Teams seeded #6, #7, #8 and #9 play in a knockout wildcard playoffs for the final berth in the quarterfinals. Matchups are:
 #6 team vs. #9 team
 #7 team vs. #8 team
 Winners of the first round for the last quarterfinal berth.
 #3, #4 and #5 teams automatically advance to the best of five quarterfinals:
 #3 team vs. winner of wildcard playoffs
 #4 vs. #5 teams
 #1 and #2 teams automatically advance to the best of seven semifinals:
Winner of first quarterfinal vs. #1
Winner of second quarterfinal vs. #2
The winners in the semifinals advance to the best of seven Finals. The losers dispute the third-place trophy in a one-game playoff.

Elimination round

Team standings

Schedule

Second seed playoff

Fifth seed playoff

Bracket

Wildcard phase

First round

Second round

Quarterfinals

(3) Derby Ace vs. (6) Rain or Shine

(4) Alaska vs. (5) Barangay Ginebra

Semifinals

(1) Talk 'N Text vs. (4) Alaska

(2) San Miguel vs. (3) Derby Ace

Third place playoff

Finals

Awards
Best Player of the Conference: Jay Washington (San Miguel)
Best Import: Gabe Freeman (San Miguel)
Finals MVPs: Cyrus Baguio and LA Tenorio (Alaska)

Imports

Conference records
Records marked with an asterisk (*) were accomplished with one or more overtime periods.

Team

Individual

Awards

Conference

Players of the Week

Statistics leaders

See also
 2009-10 PBA season

References

External links
 PBA.ph

PBA Fiesta Conference
Fiesta Conference